The 1977 Cork Senior Football Championship was the 89th staging of the Cork Senior Football Championship since its establishment by the Cork County Board in 1887. The draw for the opening round fixtures took place on 30 January 1977. The championship began on 17 April 1977 and ended on 23 October 1977.

St. Finbarr's entered the championship as the defending champions, however, they were beaten by Nemo Rangers at the quarter-final stage.

On 23 October 1977, Nemo Rangers won the championship following a 1-08 to 1-03 defeat of St Michael's in the final. This was their fourth championship title overall and their first title since 1975.

University College Cork's Leo Gould was the championship's top scorer with 3-14.

Team changes

To Championship

Promoted from the Cork Intermediate Football Championship
 Glanworth

From Championship

Regraded to the Cork Intermediate Football Championship
 Macroom

Results

First round

Second round

Quarter-finals

Semi-finals

Final

Championship statistics

Top scorers

Overall

In a single game

References

Cork Senior Football Championship